Yves Bissouma (born 30 August 1996) is a professional footballer who plays as a midfielder for  club Tottenham Hotspur. Born in Ivory Coast, he plays for the Mali national team.

Club career

Early career
Born in Issia, Ivory Coast, Bissouma trained at the Majestic SC academy in Abidjan, Ivory Coast, an academy partnered with Jean-Marc Guillou Academy in Bamako, Mali. At age 13, he was scouted to the academy in Mali, trained there for 5 years, where he played with future Mali international Adama Traoré. At age 18, he joined AS Real Bamako, Mali.

Lille
He caught the attention of French scouts in the African Nations Championship in February 2016. On 7 July 2016, four months after having arrived at Lille OSC from AS Real Bamako, Bissouma signed his first professional contract with the club, with a duration of three years.

Brighton & Hove Albion
On 17 July 2018, Bissouma transferred to English side Brighton & Hove Albion for an undisclosed fee, signing a five-year contract with the club. Bissouma made his debut for the Sussex club on the opening day of the 2018–19 Premier League season in a 2–0 away loss to Watford where he came on as a substitute. He made his first start in Brighton's third match of the season where they lost 1–0 away at Liverpool. On 5 January 2019 Bissouma scored his first Albion goal on his FA Cup debut in a 3–1 away win against south coast rivals Bournemouth in the third round.

He scored his first ever Premier League goal on the last day of the 2019–20 season with a long-range shot in a 2–1 away win against Burnley. Bissouma was given a straight red card late on in Brighton's 3–0 away victory over Newcastle in their second league match of the 2020–21 season for catching  Jamal Lewis in the face with his boot. He scored his first goal of the season in a 4–2 away defeat against Everton on 3 October. On 23 January 2021, in a fourth round FA Cup tie, Bissouma scored a 30-yard goal to put Brighton ahead in a 2–1 home win against Blackpool.

On 21 August, in Brighton's second match of the 2021–22 season he made his first Albion assist, to Neal Maupay in a 2–0 home victory over Watford. Bissouma scored his first goal of the season on 5 February 2022, putting Brighton one behind Tottenham in an eventual 3–1 away loss in the FA Cup fourth round. In April, he was suspended for Brighton's 3–0 away loss at Manchester City and 2–2 home drew against Southampton after picking up 10 yellow cards. Returning from suspension, Bissouma scored a 20-yard effort finding the bottom corner, scoring Albions third in the 3–0 away victory over Wolves taking Brighton's point tally to 44, breaking their record of 41 in the Premier League. A week later, Bissouma played the whole match of the 4–0 home win against Manchester United, which is tied for Brighton's biggest ever top flight victory.

Tottenham Hotspur

On 14 June 2022, Tottenham Hotspur agreed a £30m deal for Bissouma. Three days later, Tottenham confirmed the signing of Bissouma, with the Malian signing a four-year deal. On 6 August, Bissouma made his debut for the club in the Premier League, coming on as a second-half substitute in a 4–1 win over Southampton.

International career
Born in the Ivory Coast and moving to Mali aged thirteen to pursue a professional football career, Bissouma participated at the 2016 African Nations Championship with Mali. In the semi-final against the Ivory Coast, he was brought on as a substitute in the 76th minute and scored the decisive goal to make it 1–0 in the 89th minute. However they went on to lose in the final against DR Congo.

Bissouma was named in Mali's squad for the 2021 Africa Cup of Nations to be played in January 2022. He made an appearance in the first match on 13 January, coming on as a 59th minute substitute replacing Adama Traoré in the 1–0 controversial victory over Tunisia, with the referee blowing for full time early on two occasions. Bissouma played in all four of Mali's matches as they were knocked out via penalties against Equatorial Guniea in the round of 16 on 26 January.

Personal life
Bissouma has been banned from driving in the United Kingdom on two occasions due to repeated speeding offences in 2019 and 2021. On 6 October 2021, Sussex Police arrested Bissouma on suspicion of sexually assaulting a woman. He was led out of The Arch, a nightclub in Brighton, with handcuffs. He was initially bailed until 3 November; his bail was later extended to 6 December. On 8 December, it was announced that he had been bailed for a further four weeks. A further update in January 2022 from Sussex Police noted that he was currently released under investigation while enquiries continue. On 29 June, it was revealed that Bissouma had been cleared of all allegations.

Career statistics

Club

International

Scores and results list Mali's goal tally first, score column indicates score after each Bissouma goal.

HonoursMali'
African Nations Championship runner-up: 2016

References

External links

Profile at the Tottenham Hotspur F.C. website

1996 births
Living people
People from Sassandra-Marahoué District
Malian footballers
Mali international footballers
Association football midfielders
Ivorian footballers
Ivorian emigrants to Mali
Naturalized citizens of Mali
Lille OSC players
Brighton & Hove Albion F.C. players
Tottenham Hotspur F.C. players
Ligue 1 players
Premier League players
2016 African Nations Championship players
2017 Africa Cup of Nations players
2021 Africa Cup of Nations players
Ivorian expatriate footballers
Malian expatriate footballers
Expatriate footballers in England
Expatriate footballers in France
Ivorian expatriate sportspeople in England
Ivorian expatriate sportspeople in France
Malian expatriate sportspeople in England
Malian expatriate sportspeople in France
Malian people of Ivorian descent
21st-century Malian people
Mali A' international footballers
AS Real Bamako players